Vladimir Petrovich Maneyev (Russian: Владимир Петрович Манеев; 5 February 1932 – 8 January 1985) was a Russian Greco-Roman wrestler. He won the world welterweight title in 1955 and placed second at the 1956 Summer Olympics.

Maneyev took up wrestling in 1948 while working as a machinist in a metallurgy plant. He won the Soviet welterweight titles in 1954–55, placing second in 1952 and 1956. Besides his 1955 world title he also won the 1956 World Cup. After the Olympics, he switched to middleweight and then light-heavyweight, but his only major achievements in the heavier weights was silver medal at the 1962 national championships. He retired in 1976.

Maneyev graduated from the Siberian Metallurgic Institute with a mining degree in 1959, and in 1960–68 worked as a mine foreman, and later as section head at the Ordzhonikidze coal mine near his native Novokuznetsk. From 1968 to 1985 he took various positions at the Listvyansky coal mining quarry. He died of a heart attack aged 52. Since 2006 a memorial tournament in his honor has been held in Novokuznetsk.

References

External links
 

1932 births
1985 deaths
Olympic wrestlers of the Soviet Union
Wrestlers at the 1956 Summer Olympics
Russian male sport wrestlers
Olympic silver medalists for the Soviet Union
Olympic medalists in wrestling
Soviet male sport wrestlers
Medalists at the 1956 Summer Olympics
People from Novokuznetsk
Sportspeople from Kemerovo Oblast